Hornepayne Water Aerodrome  is located  west southwest of Hornepayne, Ontario, Canada.

See also
Hornepayne Municipal Airport

References

Registered aerodromes in Algoma District
Seaplane bases in Ontario